Barbara Lee (born 1946) is a U.S. Representative from California.

Barbara Lee may also refer to:

 Barbara Lee (actress) (died 1997), Singaporean-Chinese actress; stage name Barbara Yu Ling
 Barbara Coombs Lee (born 1947), American activist and president of Compassion & Choices
 Barbara F. Lee (born 1945), American philanthropist
 Barbara C. Lee (born 1949), director of the National Children's Center for Rural and Agricultural Health and Safety
 Barbara Brown Lee (born 1940), museum educator
 Barbara Lee (1947–1992), member of girl group the Chiffons

See also
 Barbara Lea (1929–2011), American jazz singer and actress